Alexandre Barillari (born Alexandre Barillari de Almeida, March 19, 1975, Rio de Janeiro) is a Brazilian actor.

Filmography

References

External links
 

< -- https://www.meionorte.com/entretenimento/famosos/atores-assumidamente-lgbt-que-voce-nao-fazia-ideia-que-fossem-410032/slide/36144/ >

1975 births
Living people
Male actors from Rio de Janeiro (city)
Brazilian male television actors
Brazilian male telenovela actors
20th-century Brazilian male actors
21st-century Brazilian male actors
Brazilian gay actors
Brazilian people of Italian descent